Mae Suai may refer to:
 Mae Suai District
 Mae Suai Subdistrict